Gen. William A. Mills House is a historic home located at Mount Morris in Livingston County, New York. Constructed in 1838, the Mills Homestead was the last home of Gen. William Augustus Mills (1777–1844), who was the founder and first permanent white settler of Mount Morris.  It is a -story brick dwelling combining both the Federal and Greek Revival styles. It is now headquarters of the Mount Morris Historical Society, which is responsible for the maintenance and restoration of the structure.  The house is open as a historic house museum known as the Mills Mansion.

It was listed on the National Register of Historic Places in 1978.

References

External links
The Mills Mansion - official site
Mills, Gen. William A., House - Mount Morris, New York - U.S. National Register of Historic Places on Waymarking.com
Archaeological Institute of America - AFOB Online Listing: Mills Mansion Site

Houses in Livingston County, New York
Museums in Livingston County, New York
Historic house museums in New York (state)
Historical society museums in New York (state)
Houses on the National Register of Historic Places in New York (state)
Federal architecture in New York (state)
Greek Revival houses in New York (state)
Houses completed in 1838
National Register of Historic Places in Livingston County, New York